The Faisal Mosque is the national mosque of Pakistan, located in capital Islamabad. It is the fifth-largest mosque in the world and the largest within South Asia, located on the foothills of Margalla Hills in Pakistan's capital city of Islamabad. It is named after the late King Faisal of Saudi Arabia. The mosque features a contemporary design consisting of eight sides of concrete shell and is inspired by the design of a typical Bedouin tent.

A major tourist attraction in Pakistan, the mosque is a contemporary and influential piece of Islamic architecture.

Construction of the mosque began in 1976 after a $28 million grant from Saudi King Faisal, whose name the mosque bears. The unconventional design by Turkish architect Vedat Dalokay was selected after an international competition. The design features eight-sided shell shaped sloping roofs forming a triangular worship hall which can hold 10,000 worshippers.

It is situated at the north end of Faisal Avenue, putting it at the northernmost end of the city and at the foot of Margalla Hills, the westernmost foothills of the Himalayas. It is located on an elevated area of land against a picturesque backdrop of the national park. Faisal Mosque was the largest mosque in the world from 1986 until 1993 when it was overtaken by the mosques in Saudi Arabia. Faisal Mosque is now the sixth largest mosque in the world in terms of capacity.

History 

The impetus for the mosque began in 1966 when King Faisal bin Abdul-Aziz supported the initiative of the Pakistani Government to build a national mosque in Islamabad during an official visit to Pakistan. 
In 1969, an international competition was held in which architects from 17 countries submitted 43 proposals. The winning design was that of Turkish architect Vedat Dalokay. Forty-six acres of land were assigned for the project and the execution was assigned to Pakistani engineers and workers. Construction of the mosque began in 1976 by National Construction Limited of Pakistan, led by Azim Khan and was funded by the government of Saudi Arabia, at a cost of over 130 million Saudi riyals (approximately 120 million USD today). King Faisal bin Abdul Aziz was instrumental in the funding, and both the mosque and the road leading to it were named  him after his assassination in 1975. King Faisal bin Abdulaziz's successor King Khalid laid the foundation stone for the mosque in October 1976 and signed the construction agreement in 1978. Basic information about the mosque can be found written on the foundation stone. On 18 June 1988, the first prayer was held, although the mosque was completed in 1986. The mosque grounds along with being a building for prayer also used to house the International Islamic University some years ago but has since relocated to a new campus in 2000. Some traditional and conservative Muslims criticized the design at first for its unconventional design and lack of a traditional dome structure.

Capacity

The Faisal Mosque can accommodate about 300,000 worshippers. Each of the Mosque's four minarets are 79 m (259 ft) high (the tallest minarets in South Asia) and measure 10×10 meters in circumference. The main areas have the capacity to hold up to 74000 people in the main areas including the inner hall, and the courtyards. The grounds around the mosque have the capacity to contain up to 200,000 people.

Architecture

Instead of using traditional domes, Vedat Dalokay designed an eight-sided main hall that looked like an Arab's Bedouin desert tent. The main structure of the building is the main prayer hall, which is supported by four concrete girders. The four unusual minarets are inspired by Turkish architecture. Vedat Dalokay also believed that the design of the Masjid represents Kaaba in an abstract manner. Entrance is from the east, where the prayer hall is fronted by a courtyard with porticoes. The International Islamic University was housed under the main courtyard but now has relocated to a new campus. The mosque still houses a library, lecture hall, museum, and cafe. The interior of the main tent-shaped hall is covered in white marble and decorated with mosaics and calligraphy by the famous Pakistani artist Sadequain, and a Turkish-style chandelier. The mosaic pattern adorns the west wall and has the Kalimah written in early Kufic script, repeated in mirror image pattern.

The Qibla Wall is covered with blue and white calligraphic tiles designed by a Turkish artist Mengu Ertel. The interior of the mosque uses Turkish and Pakistani inspired decorations. The mosque takes an unusual route to its design by combining contemporary and classic Islamic architecture. The unique design takes most of its elements from nomadic Bedouin tent, but it still manages to keep in contact with Islamic architecture by using Ottoman style minarets and square shape form the Kaaba.

Topography 
Located at the foot of the Margalla Hills, the location plays a significant role in Faisal Mosque. The Mosque is visible from miles away and sits on a higher surface compared to the main city. The mosque faces the city and is backed by green mountain ranges, giving it a scenic view. One of the main highways of Islamabad, Faisal Avenue leads straight to the Mosque showing the importance of the landmark. The shining white color in comparison to the dark green background makes the mosque stand out and reveal its significance to the city of Islamabad.

References in literature
The Faisal Mosque is described in the book The Kite Runner by Khalid Hosseini. It is frequently referenced in the work of Michael Muhammad Knight, who came to the mosque to study Islam as a teenager.

Gallery

See also

 Badshahi Mosque
 Islamic art
 List of mosques in Pakistan
 List of largest mosques
 List of things named after Saudi Kings
 Timeline of Muslim history

References

1986 establishments in Pakistan
Mosques completed in 1986
Mosques in Islamabad
National symbols of Pakistan
Pakistan–Saudi Arabia relations
20th-century mosques